This is a list of judges of the Federal Supreme Court of Switzerland.

Current judges

First public law division

Second public law division

First civil law division

Second civil law division

Criminal law division

First social law division

Second social law division

Former judges 

This table uses the following abbreviations:
 Party: German-language abbreviation of the name of the party nominating that judge; see Political parties of Switzerland
 Canton: Standard codes for the cantons of Switzerland
 Division:
 1C, 2C, C: (First or second) civil law division
 1P, 2P: First or second public law division
 CC: Court of Cassation
 Cs: Constitutional law division
 CsA: Constitutional and administrative law division

See also
List of presidents of the Federal Supreme Court of Switzerland

References
 Online table provided by the Court

Notes

Supreme Court, List of judges
Switzerland, Federal Supreme Court
List